Fickling is a surname. Notable people with the surname include:

Ashley Fickling (born 1972), British footballer and physiotherapist
Austin L. Fickling (1914–1977), American judge
David Fickling, British children's book editor and publisher